Swart-Wilcox House is a historic home located at Oneonta in Otsego County, New York. It is a German Palatine Vernacular settlement period house built about 1807.  It is a -story, wood-frame house with a gable roof and clapboard siding.  Attached to the house is a shed and carriage shed.  In 1972 the City of Oneonta purchased the deteriorating house.  It is operated as a community educational resource and historic house museum.

It was listed on the National Register of Historic Places in 1990.

References

External links
Swart-Wilcox House Museum - information at Greater Oneonta Historical Society
Swart-Wilcox House: Everything has a story. -https://swartwilcoxhouse.wordpress.com

Swart-Wilcox House Museum: Everything has a story....https://swartwilcoxhouse.wordpress.com

Houses on the National Register of Historic Places in New York (state)
Houses completed in 1807
Historic house museums in New York (state)
Museums in Otsego County, New York
Houses in Otsego County, New York
National Register of Historic Places in Otsego County, New York